HD 77887 (HR 3610) is a solitary star located in the southern circumpolar constellation Volans. It has an apparent magnitude of 5.87, making it faintly visible to the naked eye if viewed under ideal conditions.

HD 77887 is an ageing M-type giant that is currently on the asymptotic giant branch. At present it has 1.12 times the mass of the Sun but has expanded to 56.73 times its girth. HD 77887 is suspected to be a slow irregular variable whose brightness fluctuates at a tenth of a magnitude. Koen and Eyer examined the Hipparcos data for the star, and found that it varied periodically, with an amplitude of 0.012 magnitudes, and a period of 4.4649 days.

References 

M-type giants
077887
044283
Durchmusterung objects
Suspected variables
3610
Volans (constellation)
Asymptotic-giant-branch stars